William Shakespeare is an outdoor bronze sculpture of William Shakespeare by John Quincy Adams Ward, located in Central Park in Manhattan, New York. The statue was created in 1870 and unveiled in Central Park in 1872. Four thousand dollars towards the funding of the statue was raised at a benefit performance of Julius Caesar on November 24, 1864, performed by the sons of Junius Brutus Booth (Junius Brutus Booth, Jr., Edwin Booth, and John Wilkes Booth) at the Winter Garden Theater.

References

External links

 

1870 establishments in New York (state)
1870 sculptures
Booth family (theatre)
Bronze sculptures in Central Park
Memorials to William Shakespeare
Monuments and memorials in Manhattan
Outdoor sculptures in Manhattan
Sculptures by John Quincy Adams Ward
Sculptures in Central Park
Sculptures of men in New York City
Statues in New York City
Shakespeare